Kapler is a surname, and may refer to:

 Aleksei Kapler (1903–1979), Soviet filmmaker, screenwriter, actor, and writer
 Bruce Kapler (born 1953), musician 
 Gabe Kapler (born 1975), American major league baseball outfielder and manager
 Konrad Kapler (1925–1991), Polish football player